Latrophilin 1 is a protein that in humans is encoded by the ADGRL1 gene.  It is a member of the adhesion-GPCR family of receptors. Family members are characterized by an extended extracellular region with a variable number of protein domains coupled to a TM7 domain via a domain known as the GPCR-Autoproteolysis INducing (GAIN) domain.

Function 

This gene encodes a member of the latrophilin subfamily of G protein-coupled receptors (GPCR). Latrophilins may function in both cell adhesion and signal transduction. In experiments with non-human species, endogenous proteolytic cleavage within a cysteine-rich GPS (G-protein-coupled-receptor proteolysis site) domain resulted in two subunits (a large extracellular N-terminal cell adhesion subunit and a subunit with substantial similarity to the secretin/calcitonin family of GPCRs) being non-covalently bound at the cell membrane. Latrophilin-1 has been shown to recruit the neurotoxin from black widow spider venom, alpha-latrotoxin, to the synapse plasma membrane.

See also 
 Adhesion G protein-coupled receptors

References

Further reading

External links 
 PDBe-KB provides an overview of all the structure information available in the PDB for Mouse Adhesion G protein-coupled receptor L1  

Latrophilins